Bureau County is a county located in the U.S. state of Illinois. As of the 2020 United States Census, the population was 33,244. Its county seat is Princeton.

Bureau County is part of the Ottawa, IL Micropolitan Statistical Area, and the Hennepin Canal Parkway State Park is located partly in this county.

History
Bureau County was created from a portion of Putnam County in 1837. It is named for brothers Michel and Pierre Bureau, French Canadians who ran a trading post from 1776 until the 1780s near the conjunction of Big Bureau Creek with Illinois River. Their actual surname most likely was Belleau, but the local American Indians had difficulty pronouncing the "l" sound, which was not found in some local languages.
An early settler of this area was Bulbona, a man of mixed French and Native American descent with a Native American wife. Unlike most of the other Native Americans in the area, Bulbona remained after the area was settled by Euro-Americans and ran a trading post, where he sold whiskey among other necessities.

The founders of Princeton, the area's oldest town, were settlers from New England, descendants of the English Puritans who settled New England in the 17th century. They were part of a wave of New England farmers who moved to the Northwest Territory in the early 19th century. Most of them came soon after of the completion of the Erie Canal. When they arrived, they faced virgin forest and wild prairie. These New Englanders laid out farms, constructed roads, erected government buildings and established post routes. They brought with them many of their Yankee New England values, such as a passion for education, establishing many schools, and were staunch abolitionists. They were mostly members of the Congregationalist Church or Episcopalians. Early Bureau County, like much of northern Illinois, was culturally very continuous with early New England culture.

Like so many other areas in the Midwest, this county was on a "line" of the Underground Railroad. There was a "station" at the home of Owen Lovejoy in Princeton, and several other locations in the county.

Geography
Big Bureau Creek is the main body of water.

Adjacent counties

 Whiteside County - northwest
 Lee County - north
 LaSalle County - east
 Putnam County - southeast
 Marshall County - south
 Stark County - southwest
 Henry County - west

Major highways

  Interstate 80
  Interstate 180
  U.S. Route 6
  U.S. Route 34
  Illinois Route 26
  Illinois Route 29
  Illinois Route 40
  Illinois Route 89
  Illinois Route 92

Climate and weather

Demographics

As of the 2010 United States Census, there were 34,978 people, 14,262 households, and 9,605 families residing in the county. The racial makeup of the county was 94.2% white, 0.7% Asian, 0.6% black or African American, 0.3% American Indian, 3.0% from other races, and 1.3% from two or more races. Those of Hispanic or Latino origin made up 7.7% of the population. In terms of ancestry, 32.8% were German, 13.8% were Irish, 12.1% were English, 9.2% were American, 8.8% were Italian, 7.6% were Swedish, and 5.8% were Polish.

Of the 14,262 households, 29.8% had children under the age of 18 living with them, 53.6% were married couples living together, 9.2% had a female householder with no husband present, 32.7% were non-families, and 28.0% of all households were made up of individuals. The average household size was 2.42 and the average family size was 2.94. The median age was 42.5 years.

The median income for a household in the county was $45,692 and the median income for a family was $55,217. Males had a median income of $42,327 versus $29,210 for females. The per capita income for the county was $24,103. About 8.6% of families and 11.1% of the population were below the poverty line, including 15.3% of those under age 18 and 7.5% of those age 65 or over.

Communities

Cities
 Princeton
 Spring Valley

Villages

 Arlington
 Buda
 Bureau Junction
 Cherry
 Dalzell (part)
 DePue
 Dover
 Hollowayville
 La Moille
 Ladd
 Malden
 Manlius
 Mineral
 Neponset
 New Bedford
 Ohio
 Seatonville
 Sheffield
 Tiskilwa
 Walnut
 Wyanet

Unincorporated communities

 Coal Hollow
 Clarion
 Greenoak
 Kasbeer
 Langley
 Limerick
 Lone Tree
 Marquette
 Milo
 Normandy
 Ottville
 Providence
 Thomas
 Van Orin
 Webster Park
 Wendel
 Whitefield
 Yorktown
 Zearing

Townships

 Arispie
 Berlin
 Bureau
 Clarion
 Concord
 Dover
 Fairfield
 Gold
 Greenville
 Hall
 Indiantown
 Lamoille
 Leepertown
 Macon
 Manlius
 Milo
 Mineral
 Neponset
 Ohio
 Princeton
 Selby
 Walnut
 Westfield
 Wheatland
 Wyanet

Notable people
 Charles W. Brooks, U.S. Senator
 Warren Giles, executive in Baseball Hall of Fame
 Virgil Fox, concert organist
 Kathryn Hays, actress
 Owen Lovejoy, abolitionist minister and U.S. congressman
 Joseph R. Peterson, Illinois state legislator and lawyer
 Robert Petkoff, actor
 Eliza Suggs, author and temperance activist
 Richard Widmark, actor

Politics

As part of Yankee-settled Northern Illinois, Bureau County became powerfully Republican for the century following the Civil War. The only Democrat to carry the county between 1856 and 1988 was Franklin D. Roosevelt during his landslide 1932 victory, although Progressive Theodore Roosevelt did carry the county during the 1912 election. Between 1988 and 2012, the county trended Democratic – Bill Clinton won pluralities in both his elections and Barack Obama won an absolute majority in 2008 and nearly did so in 2012 – however concern with lack of employment opportunities in the Rust Belt led to a powerful swing toward Donald Trump in 2016 for the best GOP result since Ronald Reagan’s 1984 landslide.

See also
 National Register of Historic Places listings in Bureau County, Illinois

References
Specific

General
 US Census Bureau 2007 TIGER/Line Shapefiles
 US Board on Geographic Names (GNIS)
 US National Atlas

External links

 

 
Illinois counties
1837 establishments in Illinois
Ottawa, IL Micropolitan Statistical Area
Populated places established in 1837
Populated places on the Underground Railroad